Lethrinus harak, common names the thumbprint emperor and blackspot emperor, is a species of emperor fish.

Description
This species is olive-green in colour, becoming paler toward the belly. It can grow to a maximum length of 50 cm but is commonly found at 30 cm. There is a characteristic large blotch on the sides. It is dark and elliptical, located directly under the lateral line. This blotch often has a yellow edge.

There are occasionally pale blue dots around each nostril and bordering the lower rim of the eyes. The caudal fin is reddish or orange in colour. The pelvic, dorsal, and pectoral fins are all pinkish to white.

The mouth is somewhat protractile with thick lips.

Distribution
Lethrinus harak has been recorded from East Africa to Samoa, as far north as the southern waters of Japan, down to the northeastern parts of Australia in the south. It is also known to live in the Red Sea.

Habitat
This fish lives in depths of up to 20 metres in areas with sandy bottoms, coral rubble, and in mangroves, inshore seagrass areas, in lagoons and channels. It is non-migratory and forms small schools or may be solitary.

Diet
This species eats crustaceans, mollusks, polychaetes, echinoderms and small fishes.

References

External links
 
 

Lethrinidae
Fish described in 1775
Taxa named by Peter Forsskål